Band-e Kahnuj (also Romanized as Band-e Kahnūj and Band Kahnūj) is a village in Heruz Rural District, Kuhsaran District, Ravar County, Kerman Province, Iran. At the 2006 census, its population was 20, in 5 families.

References 

Populated places in Ravar County